The 2012 São Léo Open was a professional tennis tournament played on clay courts. It was the second edition of the tournament which was part of the 2012 ATP Challenger Tour. It took place in São Leopoldo, Brazil between 5 and 11 November 2012.

Singles main draw entrants

Seeds

 1 Rankings are as of October 29, 2012.

Other entrants
The following players received wildcards into the singles main draw:
  Stefano Blatt
  Gabriel Friedrich
  Fabricio Neis
  João Pedro Sorgi

The following players received entry from the qualifying draw:
  Tomislav Brkić
  Wilson Leite
  Diego Matos
  Alex Satschko

Champions

Singles

 Horacio Zeballos def.  Paul Capdeville, 3–6, 7–5, 7–6(7–2)

Doubles

 Fabiano de Paula /  Júlio Silva def.  Ariel Behar /  Horacio Zeballos, 6–1, 7–6(7–5)

External links
Official Website

Sao Leo Open
São Léo Open
2012 in Brazilian tennis